State Road 931 (SR 931) is a state road designation assigned to two former sections of US 31 in the U.S. state of Indiana.

Route description

Southern segment
SR 931 begins at an interchange with US 31 south of Kokomo, passing through farmland and residential properties. After crossing SR 26, the road passes through a commercial section of Kokomo. It then returns to US 31 north of Kokomo just after the intersection with US 35.

Northern segment
SR 931 runs through Lakeville then traverses a rural area briefly before reaching the southern edge of the South Bend urban area at its northern end.

History

Southern segment
In 2013 US 31 was rerouted onto a new bypass around Kokomo and the designation along the old bypass, built as a relocated US 31 in 1952, became SR 931.

Northern segment
In 2014 the segment of US 31 freeway from US 30 near Plymouth to US 20 (St. Joseph Valley Parkway) in South Bend opened, and the segment of what had been US 31 in St. Joseph County outside of South Bend became SR 931. This segment had been expected to be removed from the state highway system in mid-2018. The bypassed portion in Marshall County was transferred to the county and to the town of La Paz rather than being retained by the state.

Major intersections

See also

References

External links

931
U.S. Route 31
Transportation in Howard County, Indiana
Transportation in Tipton County, Indiana